The Roma–Ostia Half Marathon ( or ) is an annual half marathon road running event which takes place in early March in Rome, Italy. The course begins in the EUR district of the city and follows a direct southeasterly route to the finish point near the beaches of Ostia. It is Italy's most popular half marathon, with a record 12,000 entries and 9,485 finishers in 2011.

The competition is organised by the Gruppo Sportivo Bancari Romani in partnership with RCS Sports & Events comprises three distinct races. There is an elite level race for male and female athletes, a popular fun run for amateurs, and a "Business Run" which sees teams of runners represent domestic companies in the Campionato Italian Imprenditori di Mezza Maratona (Italian Business Championships in the Half Marathon). The Roma-Ostia race has been held every year since its inception, with the exceptions of 1982 and 1999.

The race was inaugurated in March 1974 and was held on a 28-kilometre course. In its first dozen editions, the Roma-Ostia ranged from a distance of 27 km to 30 km. It was converted into an official half marathon race of 21.1 km for the 1987 edition and has remained so ever since. The course has a point-to-point format and as a result it some editions have had an overall downhill drop, as well as athlete-assisting tailwinds. Due to these factors, some performances have been ineligible for personal bests or records.

In 2011 the course was significantly altered, allowing for faster times and record performances. Both the men's and women's course records were set in 2012. Philemon Kimeli Limo's time of 59:32 minutes stands as the men's course record, while Florence Kiplagat's run of 1:06:38 is the current record for females.

The 2020 edition of the race was cancelled due to the coronavirus pandemic.

Past winners of the elite race include Stefano Baldini (the 2004 Olympic marathon champion), four-time Boston Marathon winner Robert Kipkoech Cheruiyot, Franca Fiacconi (1998 New York Marathon winner), Olympic marathon bronze medalist Galen Rupp and Mediterranean champion Souad Aït Salem.

Past winners

Key:

References

Further reading
Luciano Duchi: "Una Corsa…una vita". La storia della Roma–Ostia raccontata attraverso i ricordi di chi l’ha creata e vissuta. Rome 2005

External links
Official website

Half marathons
Athletics competitions in Italy
Recurring sporting events established in 1974
Sports competitions in Rome
Winter events in Italy
1974 establishments in Italy
Athletics in Rome